Tiangong-2 was a Chinese space laboratory and part of the Project 921-2 space station program. Tiangong-2 was launched on 15 September 2016. It was deorbited as planned on 19 July 2019.

Tiangong-2 was neither designed nor planned to be a permanent orbital station; rather, it was intended as a testbed for key technologies used in the Tiangong station (Chinese large modular space station) of which the first module launched on 29 April 2021 and the remaining modules of which launched in 2022.

History 

The China Manned Space Engineering Office published a brief description of Tiangong-2 and its successor Tiangong-3 in 2008, indicating that at least two crewed spaceships would be launched to dock with Tiangong-2.

Tiangong-2 was originally expected to be launched by the China National Space Agency (CNSA) by 2015  to replace the prototype module Tiangong-1, which was launched in September 2011. In March 2011, Chinese officials stated that Tiangong-2 was scheduled to be launched by 2015. An uncrewed cargo spacecraft will dock with the station, allowing for resupply.

In September 2014, its launch was postponed to September 2016. Plans for visits in October 2016 by the crewed mission Shenzhou 11 and the uncrewed resupply craft Tianzhou were made public. The station was successfully launched from Jiuquan aboard a Long March 2F rocket on 15 September 2016. Shenzhou 11 (Only Expedition) successfully docked with Tiangong-2 on 19 October 2016.

Aboard the Shenzhou 11, launched from Jiuquan Satellite Launch Center in the Gobi desert, were Commander Jing Haipeng and Chen Dong who formed the inaugural crew for the space laboratory. It was China's first crewed mission for more than three years.

During the 30 days the two astronauts were aboard Tiangong-2, they conducted a number of scientific and technical experiments on the physiological effects of weightlessness, tests on human-machine collaboration on in-orbit maintenance technology and released an accompanying satellite successfully. Accompanying photography and near-distance fly-by observation were also carried out. They collected abundant data and made some achievements in programs of gamma-ray burst polarimeter, space cold atomic clock and preparation of new materials.

Shenzhou 11 separated from the orbiting Tiangong-2 space laboratory on 17 November 2016, reentry module landed successfully at the expected site in central Inner Mongolia Autonomous Region at about 13:59 Beijing Time.

On 22 April 2017, the cargo vessel Tianzhou-1 successfully docked with Tiangong-2 marking the first successful docking and refuelling with the orbiting space laboratory. It subsequently performed a second docking and refueling on 15 June 2017. On 12 September 2017, Tianzhou-1 performed the third and final docking and refuelling with Tiangong-2, with what is termed a fast docking which took 6.5 hours, rather than 2 days, to complete.

In June 2018, Tiangong-2 performed orbital maneuvers lowering the orbit to 292 × 297 kilometers, likely in preparation for deorbiting. It then returned to its usual orbit.

In July 2019, the China Manned Space Engineering Office announced that it was planning to deorbit Tiangong-2 in the near future, but no specific date was given. The station subsequently made a controlled reentry on 19 July 2019 and burned up over the South Pacific Ocean.

Dimensions  
The dimensions of Tiangong-2 were:
 Crew size: 2, with 30 days of life support resources. The crew (from Shenzhou 11, October 2016) consists of two astronauts.
 Length: .
 Maximum diameter: .
 Mass: .

Further developments 

Tianhe is the core module of the Chinese space station. The core module and its other parts are to be launched between 2021 and 2022.

See also 

 Chinese space program
 Chinese space station – a successive multi-module orbital station
 Shenzhou program
 International Space Station
 List of space stations
 Salyut programme – a similar Soviet space station

References

External links 
 

Chinese space stations
Tiangong program
Spacecraft launched in 2016
2016 in China
Spacecraft which reentered in 2019
Space stations
Satellites in low Earth orbit